This is a list of monuments in Achham District, Nepal as officially recognized by and available through the website of the Department of Archaeology, Nepal. Achham is a district of Sudurpashchim Province and is located in western Nepal. Dewals and Hindu temples are the main attraction of this district.

List of monuments

|}

See also 
 List of monuments in Sudurpashchim Province
 List of monuments in Nepal

References 

Achham